Maitland Jones Jr. (born November 23, 1937) is an American experimental chemist. Jones started working at Princeton University in 1964, where he stayed until 2007, where he retired from Princeton and then taught at New York University from 2007 to 2022.  He is known for changing how the subject of organic chemistry is taught to undergraduate students, through writing a popular textbook, Organic Chemistry, and re-shaping the course from simple rote learning to one that focuses on scientific problem solving.

Education 
Jones earned a Bachelor of Science, Master of Science, and PhD from Yale University.

Career 
Jones' field of expertise is reactive intermediates, with particular emphasis on carbenes. He has published extensively in the field of quantum organic chemistry, particularly focusing on the mechanism of quantum molecular reactions. His interest areas include carbenes, carboranes, and heterocycles. Over the course of almost forty years, he and his research group have published 225 papers, averaging some five papers per year or one paper per active group member per year. 

Jones is also the author of Organic Chemistry texts. He is credited with the naming of bullvalene, which is named after William "Bull" Doering, whom Jones was studying under during his time as a graduate student at Yale University.

He established his Jones research Lab at Princeton from 1964 to 2004.  During this time, he published papers with 63 undergraduates, 30 graduate students and 34 postdoctoral fellows and visitors.

Teaching 
Jones is credited as being among the early adapters of the distance education technology, in the late 1960s, using the Victor Electrowriter Remote Blackboard (VERB) system.

After retiring from Princeton in 2007, Jones taught organic chemistry at New York University until spring 2022 on annual contract basis.  NYU offers different classes to students majoring in chemistry and pre-med students, and Jones was assigned to teach aspiring doctors. His contract at NYU was not renewed in 2022 after students complained that the class was too hard and did not provide adequate academic support. Jones said that the premed students' study skills and ability to focus had been declining during the previous decade, and then had declined dramatically after the interruption of the COVID-19 pandemic.  The non-renewal of Jones' contract concerned professors inside and outside of NYU. Alán Aspuru-Guzik, a professor at the University of Toronto, suggested that the student petition points to a "premed culture" in which the most important outcome of a course is the grade for the medical school application and the effects of social media distractions such as TikTok on the amount of studying done by students. The head of NYU's Chemistry Department Mark Tuckerman, said that the decision not to renew Jones’s contract was made against the department’s recommendation, which was to have Jones teach organic chemistry to students majoring in chemistry, because chemistry majors would appreciate Jones' high standards.

Textbooks 
Jones is the first author of an influential textbook on Organic Chemistry. The book, first published in 1997, is now in its fifth edition (2014). 
Organic Chemistry, Jones, M. Jr., Fleming, S.A., W. W. Norton, New York, 1997
Instructor's Manual and Supplementary Problems Set for Organic Chemistry, Jones, M. Jr., Ovaska, T. W. W. Norton, New York, 1997.
Study Guide for Organic Chemistry, Jones, M. Jr.; Gingrich, H. L. W. W. Norton, New York, 1997
Study Guide for Organic Chemistry, Third Edition, Jones, M. Jr.; Gingrich, H. L. W. W. Norton, New York, 2004
How to Survive and Thrive in Organic Chemistry for Dummies. Second Edition, Jones, M. Jr.; Gingrich, H. L. W. W. Norton, New York, 2004

Academic experience 
Postdoctoral Fellow, Yale University (1963)
Postdoctoral Fellow, University of Wisconsin–Madison (1963–1964)
Instructor in Chemistry, Princeton University (1964–1966)
Assistant Professor, Princeton University (1966–1970)
Visiting Assistant Professor, Columbia University (1969–1970)
Associate Professor, Princeton University (1970–1973)
Professor, Princeton University (1973–2007)
Visiting Professor, Vrije Universiteit, Amsterdam (1973–1974, 1978)
David B. Jones Professor of Chemistry, Princeton University (1983–2007)
Visiting Professor, Harvard University (1986)
Visiting Professor, Kiev Polytechnic Institute (1990)
Visiting Professor, Fudan University (1994)
Professor, New York University (2007–2022)

Awards and honors 
David B. Jones Professor of Chemistry (Princeton University)

References

External links 
Faculty website

1937 births
Living people
21st-century American chemists
Princeton University faculty
Yale University alumni
Organic chemists
New York University faculty